The antennas contained in mobile phones, including smartphones, emit radiofrequency (RF) radiation (non-ionizing "radio waves" such as microwaves); the parts of the head or body nearest to the antenna can absorb this energy and convert it to heat. Since at least the 1990s, scientists have researched whether the now-ubiquitous radiation associated with mobile phone antennas or cell phone towers is affecting human health. Mobile phone networks use various bands of RF radiation, some of which overlap with the microwave range. Other digital wireless systems, such as data communication networks, produce similar radiation.

In response to public concern, the World Health Organization (WHO) established the International EMF (Electric and Magnetic Fields) Project in 1996 to assess the scientific evidence of possible health effects of EMF in the frequency range from 0 to 300 GHz. They have stated that although extensive research has been conducted into possible health effects of exposure to many parts of the frequency spectrum, all reviews conducted so far have indicated that, as long as exposures are below the limits recommended in the ICNIRP (1998) EMF guidelines, which cover the full frequency range from 0–300 GHz, such exposures do not produce any known adverse health effect. In 2011, International Agency for Research on Cancer (IARC), an agency of the WHO, classified wireless radiation as Group 2B – possibly carcinogenic. That means that there "could be some risk" of carcinogenicity, so additional research into the long-term, heavy use of wireless devices needs to be conducted. The WHO states that "A large number of studies have been performed over the last two decades to assess whether mobile phones pose a potential health risk. To date, no adverse health effects have been established as being caused by mobile phone use."

International guidelines on exposure levels to microwave frequency EMFs such as ICNIRP limit the power levels of wireless devices and it is uncommon for wireless devices to exceed the guidelines. These guidelines only take into account thermal effects, as non-thermal effects have not been conclusively demonstrated. The official stance of the British Health Protection Agency (HPA) is that "[T]here is no consistent evidence to date that Wi-Fi and WLANs adversely affect the health of the general population", but also that "... it is a sensible precautionary approach ... to keep the situation under ongoing review ...". In a 2018 statement, the FDA said that "the current safety limits are set to include a 50-fold safety margin from observed effects of Radio-frequency energy exposure".

Exposure

Mobile phones 
A mobile phone connects to the telephone network by radio waves exchanged with a local antenna and automated transceiver called a cellular base station (cell site or cell tower). The service area served by each provider is divided into small geographical areas called cells, and all the phones in a cell communicate with that cell's antenna. Both the phone and the tower have radio transmitters which communicate with each other. Since in a cellular network the same radio channels are reused every few cells, cellular networks use low power transmitters to avoid radio waves from one cell spilling over and interfering with a nearby cell using the same frequencies.

Mobile phones are limited to an effective isotropic radiated power (EIRP) output of 3 watts, and the network continuously adjusts the phone transmitter to the lowest power consistent with good signal quality, reducing it to as low as one milliwatt when near the cell tower. Tower channel transmitters usually have an EIRP power output of around 50 watts. Even when it is not being used, unless it is turned off, a mobile phone
periodically emits radio signals on its control channel, to keep contact with its cell tower and for functions like handing off the phone to another tower if the user crosses into another cell. When the user is making a call, the phone transmits a signal on a second channel which carries the user's voice. Existing 2G, 3G, and 4G networks use frequencies in the UHF or low microwave bands, 600 MHz to 3.5 GHz. Many household wireless devices such as WiFi networks, garage door openers, and baby monitors use other frequencies in this same frequency range.

Radio waves decrease rapidly in intensity by the inverse square of distance as they spread out from a transmitting antenna. So the phone transmitter, which is held close to the user's face when talking, is a much greater source of human exposure than the tower transmitter, which is typically at least hundreds of metres away from the user. A user can reduce their exposure by using a headset and keeping the phone itself farther away from their body.

Next generation 5G cellular networks, which began deploying in 2019, use higher frequencies in or near the millimetre wave band, 24 to 52 GHz. Millimetre waves are absorbed by atmospheric gases so 5G networks will use smaller cells than previous cellular networks, about the size of a city block. Instead of a cell tower, each cell will use an array of multiple small antennas mounted on existing buildings and utility poles. In general, millimetre waves penetrate less deeply into biological tissue than microwaves, and are mainly absorbed within the first centimetres of the body surface.

Cordless phones 
The HPA also says that due to the mobile phone's adaptive power ability, a DECT cordless phone's radiation could actually exceed the radiation of a mobile phone. The HPA explains that while the DECT cordless phone's radiation has an average output power of 10 mW, it is actually in the form of 100 bursts per second of 250 mW, a strength comparable to some mobile phones.

Wireless networking
Most wireless LAN equipment is designed to work within predefined standards. Wireless access points are also often close to people, but the drop off in power over distance is fast, following the inverse-square law. However, wireless laptops are typically used close to people. WiFi had been anecdotally linked to electromagnetic hypersensitivity but research into electromagnetic hypersensitivity has found no systematic evidence supporting claims made by affected people.

Users of wireless networking devices are typically exposed for much longer periods than for mobile phones and the strength of wireless devices is not significantly less. Whereas a Universal Mobile Telecommunications System (UMTS) phone can range from 21 dBm (125 mW) for Power Class 4 to 33 dBm (2W) for Power class 1, a wireless router can range from a typical 15 dBm (30 mW) strength to 27 dBm (500 mW) on the high end.

However, wireless routers are typically located significantly farther away from users' heads than a phone the user is handling, resulting in far less exposure overall. The Health Protection Agency (HPA) says that if a person spends one year in a location with a WiFi hot spot, they will receive the same dose of radio waves as if they had made a 20-minute call on a mobile phone.

The HPA's position is that "... radio frequency (RF) exposures from WiFi are likely to be lower than those from mobile phones." It also saw "... no reason why schools and others should not use WiFi equipment." In October 2007, the HPA launched a new "systematic" study into the effects of WiFi networks on behalf of the UK government, in order to calm fears that had appeared in the media in a recent period up to that time. Michael Clark of the HPA says published research on mobile phones and masts does not add up to an indictment of WiFi.

Effects studied

Blood–brain barrier
A 2010 review stated that "The balance of experimental evidence does not support an effect of 'non-thermal' radio frequency fields" on the permeability of the blood–brain barrier, but noted that research on low frequency effects and effects in humans was sparse. A 2012 study of low-frequency radiation on humans found "no evidence for acute effects of short-term mobile phone radiation on cerebral blood flow".

Cancer

There is no known way in which radiofrequency radiation (in contrast to ionizing radiation) affects DNA and causes cancer. In 2011 the IARC, a World Health Organization working group, classified mobile phone use as "possibly carcinogenic to humans". The IARC summed up their conclusion with: "The human epidemiological evidence was mixed. Several small early case–control studies were considered to be largely uninformative. A large cohort study showed no increase in risk of relevant tumours, but it lacked information on level of mobile-phone use and there were several potential sources of misclassification of exposure. The bulk of evidence came from reports of the INTERPHONE study, a very large international, multicentre case–control study and a separate large case–control study from Sweden on gliomas and meningiomas of the brain and acoustic neuromas. While affected by selection bias and information bias to varying degrees, these studies showed an association between glioma and acoustic neuroma and mobile-phone use; specifically in people with highest cumulative use of mobile phones, in people who had used mobile phones on the same side of the head as that on which their tumour developed, and in people whose tumour was in the temporal lobe of the brain (the area of the brain that is most exposed to RF radiation when a wireless phone is used at the ear)". The CDC states that no scientific evidence definitively answers whether mobile phone use causes cancer.

In a 2018 statement, the US Food and Drug Administration said that "the current safety limits are set to include a 50-fold safety margin from observed effects of radiofrequency energy exposure".

On 1 November 2018, the US National Toxicology Program published the final version (after peer review that was performed through March 2018) of its "eagerly anticipated" study using rats and mice, conducted over some ten years. This report concludes after the review with an updated statement that "there is clear evidence that male rats exposed to high levels of radio frequency radiation (RFR) like that used in 2G and 3G cell phones developed cancerous heart tumors.... There was also some evidence of tumors in the brain and adrenal gland of exposed male rats. For female rats, and male and female mice, the evidence was equivocal as to whether cancers observed were associated with exposure to RFR". An analysis of preliminary results from the study argued that due to such issues as the inconsistent appearances of "signals for harm" within and across species and the increased chances of false positives due to the multiplicity of tests, the positive results seen are more likely due to random chance. The full results of the study were released for peer review in February 2018.

A 2021 review found "limited" but "sufficient" evidence for radio frequencies in the range of 450 MHz to 6,000 MHz to be related to gliomas and acoustic neuromas in humans, however concluding also that "... the evidence is not yet sufficiently strong to establish a direct relationship". Conclusions could not be drawn for higher frequencies due to insufficient adequate studies.

Fertility and reproduction
A decline in male sperm quality has been observed over several decades. Studies on the impact of mobile radiation on male fertility are conflicting, and the effects of the radio frequency electromagnetic radiation (RF-EMR) emitted by these devices on the reproductive systems are currently under active debate. A 2012 review concluded that "together, the results of these studies have shown that RF-EMR decreases sperm count and motility and increases oxidative stress". A 2017 study of 153 men that attended an academic fertility clinic in Boston, Massachusetts found that self-reported mobile phone use was not related to semen quality, and that carrying a mobile phone in the pants pocket was not related to semen quality.

A 2021 review concluded 5G radio frequencies in the range of 450 MHz to 6,000 MHz affect male fertility, possibly affect female fertility, and may have adverse effects on the development of embryos, fetuses and newborns. Conclusions could not be drawn for higher frequencies due to insufficient adequate studies.

Electromagnetic hypersensitivity

Some users of mobile phones and similar devices have reported feeling various non-specific symptoms during and after use. Studies have failed to link any of these symptoms to electromagnetic exposure. In addition, EHS is not a recognized medical diagnosis.

Glucose metabolism
According to the National Cancer Institute, two small studies exploring whether and how mobile phone radiation affects brain glucose metabolism showed inconsistent results.

Effects on children
A report from the Australian Government's Radiation Protection and Nuclear Safety Agency (ARPANSA) in June 2017 noted that:

Other organisms 
Low-level EMF does have some effects on other organisms. Vian et al., 2006 finds an effect of microwave on gene expression in plants.

Base stations

Experts consulted by France considered it was mandatory that the main antenna axis should not to be directly in front of a living place at a distance shorter than 100 metres. This recommendation was modified in 2003 to say that antennas located within a 100-metre radius of primary schools or childcare facilities should be better integrated into the city scape and was not included in a 2005 expert report. 
The Agence française de sécurité sanitaire environnementale, says that there is no demonstrated short-term effect of electromagnetic fields on health, but that there are open questions for long-term effects, and that it is easy to reduce exposure via technological improvements. A 2020 study in Environmental Research found that "Although direct causation of negative human health effects from RFR from cellular phone base stations has not been finalized, there is already enough medical and scientific evidence to warrant long-term liability concerns for companies deploying cellular phone towers" and thus recommended voluntary setbacks from schools and hospitals.

Safety standards and licensing
To protect the population living around base stations and users of mobile handsets, governments and regulatory bodies adopt safety standards, which translate to limits on exposure levels below a certain value. There are many proposed national and international standards, but that of the International Commission on Non-Ionizing Radiation Protection (ICNIRP) is the most respected one, and has been adopted so far by more than 80 countries. For radio stations, ICNIRP proposes two safety levels: one for occupational exposure, another one for the general population. Currently there are efforts underway to harmonize the different standards in existence.

Radio base licensing procedures have been established in the majority of urban spaces regulated either at municipal/county, provincial/state or national level. Mobile telephone service providers are, in many regions, required to obtain construction licenses, provide certification of antenna emission levels and assure compliance to ICNIRP standards and/or to other environmental legislation.

Many governmental bodies also require that competing telecommunication companies try to achieve sharing of towers so as to decrease environmental and cosmetic impact. This issue is an influential factor of rejection of installation of new antennas and towers in communities.

The safety standards in the US are set by the Federal Communications Commission (FCC). The FCC has based its standards primarily on those standards established by the National Council on Radiation Protection and Measurements (NCRP) a Congressionally chartered scientific organization located in the WDC area and the Institute of Electrical and Electronics Engineers (IEEE), specifically Subcommittee 4 of the "International Committee on Electromagnetic Safety".

Switzerland has set safety limits lower than the ICNIRP limits for certain "sensitive areas" (classrooms, for example).

In March 2020, for the first time since 1998, ICNIRP updated its guidelines for exposures to frequencies over 6 GHz, including the frequencies used for 5G that are over 6 GHz. The Commission added a restriction on acceptable levels of exposure to the whole body, added a restriction on acceptable levels for brief exposures to small regions of the body, and reduced the maximum amount of exposure permitted over a small region of the body.

Lawsuits
In the US, personal injury lawsuits have been filed by individuals against manufacturers (including Motorola, NEC, Siemens, and Nokia) on the basis of allegations of causation of brain cancer and death. In US federal courts, expert testimony relating to science must be first evaluated by a judge, in a Daubert hearing, to be relevant and valid before it is admissible as evidence. In a 2002 case against Motorola, the plaintiffs alleged that the use of wireless handheld telephones could cause brain cancer and that the use of Motorola phones caused one plaintiff's cancer. The judge ruled that no sufficiently reliable and relevant scientific evidence in support of either general or specific causation was proffered by the plaintiffs, accepted a motion to exclude the testimony of the plaintiffs' experts, and denied a motion to exclude the testimony of the defendants' experts.

Two separate cases in Italy, in 2009 and 2017, resulted in pensions being awarded to plaintiffs who had claimed their benign brain tumors were the result of prolonged mobile phone use in professional tasks, for 5–6 hours a day, which they ruled different from non-professional use.

In the UK Legal Action Against 5G sought a Judicial Review of the government's plan to deploy 5G. If successful, the group was to be represented by Michael Mansfield QC, a prominent British barrister. This application was denied on the basis that the government had demonstrated that 5G was as safe as 4G, and that the applicants had brought their action too late.

Precautions

Precautionary principle
In 2000, the World Health Organization (WHO) recommended that the precautionary principle could be voluntarily adopted in this case. It follows the recommendations of the European Community for environmental risks.

According to the WHO, the "precautionary principle" is "a risk management policy applied in circumstances with a high degree of scientific uncertainty, reflecting the need to take action for a potentially serious risk without awaiting the results of scientific research." Other less stringent recommended approaches are prudent avoidance principle and as low as reasonably practicable. Although all of these are problematic in application, due to the widespread use and economic importance of wireless telecommunication systems in modern civilization, there is an increased popularity of such measures in the general public, though also evidence that such approaches may increase concern. They involve recommendations such as the minimization of usage, the limitation of use by at-risk population (e.g., children), the adoption of phones and microcells with as low as reasonably practicable levels of radiation, the wider use of hands-free and earphone technologies such as Bluetooth headsets, the adoption of maximal standards of exposure, RF field intensity and distance of base stations antennas from human habitations, and so forth. Overall, public information remains a challenge as various health consequences are evoked in the literature and by the media, putting populations under chronic exposure to potentially worrying information.

Precautionary measures and health advisories
In May 2011, the World Health Organization's International Agency for Research on Cancer classified electromagnetic fields from mobile phones and other sources as "possibly carcinogenic to humans" and advised the public to adopt safety measures to reduce exposure, like use of hands-free devices or texting.

Some national radiation advisory authorities, including those of Austria, France, Germany, and Sweden, have recommended measures to minimize exposure to their citizens. Examples of the recommendations are:

 Use hands-free to decrease the radiation to the head.
 Keep the mobile phone away from the body.
 Do not use telephone in a car without an external antenna.

The use of "hands-free" was not recommended by the British Consumers' Association in a statement in November 2000, as they believed that exposure was increased. However, measurements for the (then) UK Department of Trade and Industry and others for the French  showed substantial reductions. In 2005, Professor Lawrie Challis and others said clipping a ferrite bead onto hands-free kits stops the radio waves travelling up the wire and into the head.

Several nations have advised moderate use of mobile phones for children. An article by Gandhi et al. in 2006 states that children receive higher levels of Specific Absorption Rate (SAR). When 5- and 10-year-olds are compared to adults, they receive about 153% higher SAR levels. Also, with the permittivity of the brain decreasing as one gets older and the higher relative volume of the exposed growing brain in children, radiation penetrates far beyond the mid-brain.

5G

The FDA is quoted as saying that it "...continues to believe that the current safety limits for cellphone radiofrequency energy exposure remain acceptable for protecting the public health."

During the COVID-19 pandemic, misinformation circulated claiming that 5G networks contribute to the spread of COVID-19.

Bogus products
Products have been advertised that claim to shield people from EM radiation from mobile phones; in the US the Federal Trade Commission published a warning that "Scam artists follow the headlines to promote products that play off the newsand prey on concerned people."

According to the FTC, "there is no scientific proof that so-called shields significantly reduce exposure from electromagnetic emissions. Products that block only the earpieceor another small portion of the phoneare totally ineffective because the entire phone emits electromagnetic waves." Such shields "may interfere with the phone's signal, cause it to draw even more power to communicate with the base station, and possibly emit more radiation." The FTC has enforced false advertising claims against companies that sell such products.

See also

 Electromagnetic radiation and health
 Bioelectromagnetics
 Bioinitiative Report
 COSMOS cohort study
 Microwave News
 Possible health effects of body scanners
 Radiobiology
 Misinformation related to 5G technology

References

External links
 Summary and full text of "Possible effects of Electromagnetic Fields (EMF) on Human Health", the 2007 scientific assessment of the European Commission's SCENIHR (Scientific Committee on Emerging and Newly Identified Health Risks).
 WHO International EMF Program
 FDA Cell Phone Facts
 FCC Radio Frequency Safety
 Medline Plus, by US National Library of Medicine and National Institutes of Health (NIH)
 Public health and electromagnetic fields: Overview of European Commission activities
 About Router Radiation

Radiobiology
Mobile telecommunications
Wireless
Health effects by subject
Medical physics
Environmental controversies